Marius Grigonis (born 26 April 1994) is a Lithuanian professional basketball player for Panathinaikos of the Greek Basket League and the EuroLeague.

Early career 
Before starting his professional career, Grigonis played in the NKL with the Žalgiris-Arvydas Sabonis school for four seasons. He was an important contributor to the team during his debut season, and established himself as a leader by his third season. He won bronze medals during his last two seasons with the Sabonis school team.

Professional career 
On 15 May 2013, Grigonis was brought into the main Žalgiris roster for a game against BC Nizhny Novgorod in the VTB United League.

Playing in Spain (2013–2017) 
For the 2013–14 season, Grigonis was loaned to the Spanish second division team Peñas Huesca. He was included in the All-LEB Oro team.

On 14 August 2014, Grigonis signed a two-year deal with Bàsquet Manresa of the Liga ACB. After spending two seasons with Manresa, he signed a "2+1" deal with Iberostar Tenerife on 28 July 2016. He was named the Final Four MVP of the Basketball Champions League 2016–17 season. On 13 July 2017, Grigonis parted ways with Tenerife.

ALBA Berlin (2017–2018) 
On 13 July 2017, he signed a three-year deal with German club Alba Berlin.

Return to Žalgiris (2018–2021) 
On 3 July 2018, Grigonis returned to Žalgiris Kaunas when he signed a three-year contract. His season was cut short due to an injury in November 2019. Grigonis averaged 11.5 points, 2.6 rebounds and 2.0 assists per game in the first 10 games of the 2019–20 season. On 8 July 2020, he re-signed with the team.

CSKA Moscow (2021–2022) 
On 12 June 2021, Grigonis signed a three-year contract with VTB United League champions and EuroLeague giant CSKA Moscow. He averaged 8.5 points, 1.9 assists, and 1.4 rebounds per game. 

On 28 February 2022, upon the outbreak of the 2022 Russian invasion of Ukraine, he left the team. The team accused him of violating his contract.

Panathinaikos (2022–present) 
On 14 July 2022, Grigonis signed a two-year contract with Panathinaikos of the Greek Basket League and the EuroLeague, after a settlement agreement between the Greek club and CSKA Moscow.

National team career 
Grigonis represented Lithuania in the U–16, U–18, U–19 and U–20 youth tournaments. He led his team to two silver medals and a bronze medal while participating in four tournaments. During the 2012 FIBA Europe Under-18 Championship semifinal game, he scored the winning shot against Serbia. As a result of his contributions to the team's success, he was chosen to be included in the All–Tournament Team. In 2014, coach Jonas Kazlauskas included Grigonis in the preliminary 24–player candidate list for the senior national basketball team. Though, he was invited to the national team training camp for the first time only in 2016 and immediately qualified into the Olympic roster.

Career statistics

EuroLeague 

|-
| style="text-align:left;"|2018–19
| style="text-align:left;"|Žalgiris Kaunas
| 34 || 18 || 20.4 || .466 || .442 || .935 || 2.1 || 1.9 || .6 || .2 || 8.7 || 9.3
|-
| style="text-align:left;"|2019–20
| style="text-align:left;"|Žalgiris Kaunas
| 10 || 10 || 25.5 || .447 || .386 || .846 || 2.6 || 2 || .5 || .1 || 11.5 || 11
|-
| style="text-align:left;"|2020–21
| style="text-align:left;"|Žalgiris Kaunas
| 34 || 34 || 27.3 || .481|| .456 || .944 || 2.1 ||  3.3 || .8 || .1 || 13.4 || 13.7
|-
| style="text-align:left;"| 2021–22
| style="text-align:left;"| CSKA Moscow
| 16 || 3 || 19.2 || .429 || .444 || .955 || 1.4 || 1.9 || 0.6 || .0 || 8.5 || 7.4

References

External links 

 Marius Grigonis at euroleague.net
 Marius Grigonis at acb.com
 Marius Grigonis at fiba.com

1994 births
Living people
2019 FIBA Basketball World Cup players
Alba Berlin players
Basketball players at the 2016 Summer Olympics
Basketball players from Kaunas
Bàsquet Manresa players
BC Žalgiris players
BC Žalgiris-2 players
CB Canarias players
CB Peñas Huesca players
Liga ACB players
Lithuanian expatriate basketball people in Germany
Lithuanian expatriate basketball people in Greece
Lithuanian expatriate basketball people in Russia
Lithuanian expatriate basketball people in Spain
Lithuanian men's basketball players
Olympic basketball players of Lithuania
Panathinaikos B.C. players
PBC CSKA Moscow players
Shooting guards
Small forwards
Sportspeople from Kaunas